Adrian D'Sean Tracy (born April 6, 1988) is a professional gridiron football defensive end who is a free agent. He most recently played for the Toronto Argonauts of the Canadian Football League (CFL). He was selected in the sixth round (184th overall) of the 2010 NFL Draft by the New York Giants. Tracy played college football at the College of William & Mary.

Professional career

New York Giants
Tracy was signed to a multi-year deal with the Giants in June 2010, after being selected by them in the 2010 NFL Draft. In preseason, he suffered a dislocated elbow and was placed on IR for the remainder of the season. He was waived by the Giants on September 3, 2011, but was re-signed to the practice squad the next day.

Arizona Cardinals
Tracy was signed to a reserve/future contract with the Arizona Cardinals on January 9, 2014. The Cardinals released Tracy on August 30, 2014.

Hamilton Tiger-Cats
Tracy signed with the Hamilton Tiger-Cats on December 17, 2014. He played in regular season games over five years for the Tiger-Cats, recording 131 defensive tackles, 21 sacks, five forced fumbles, and two interceptions. He became a free agent on February 11, 2020.

Montreal Alouettes
On February 13, 2020, Tracy signed with the Montreal Alouettes. However, the 2020 CFL season was cancelled and he did not play in 2020. His contract expired on February 9, 2021, and he did not sign with a team in 2021.

Toronto Argonauts
On February 9, 2022, it was announced that Tracy had signed with the Toronto Argonauts. However, he was released with the final training camp cuts on June 5, 2022.

References

External links
Toronto Argonauts bio
New York Giants bio
William & Mary Tribe bio

1988 births
Living people
Sportspeople from Fairfax, Virginia
Players of American football from Virginia
American football linebackers
Canadian football linebackers
American players of Canadian football
William & Mary Tribe football players
New York Giants players
Arizona Cardinals players
Hamilton Tiger-Cats players
Montreal Alouettes players
Toronto Argonauts players